Nasser Khamees Mubarak (born 2 August 1965) is a UAE football (soccer) player who played as a midfielder for the UAE national football team and Al Wasl FC Club in Dubai. He is considered one of the best midfielders played for the UAE national team ever. Fast, quite a good dribbler, and a goal scorer when needed.

Khamees played for the UAE at the 1990 FIFA World Cup finals in Italy.

References

1965 births
Living people
Emirati footballers
1990 FIFA World Cup players
1992 AFC Asian Cup players
1997 FIFA Confederations Cup players
Al-Wasl F.C. players
Footballers at the 1986 Asian Games
United Arab Emirates international footballers
UAE Pro League players
Association football midfielders
Asian Games competitors for the United Arab Emirates
Footballers at the 1994 Asian Games